Phyllotopsis is a genus of fungi in the family Phyllotopsidaceae. The widespread genus contain five species that occur predominantly in temperate regions.

Species

References

External links

Agaricales genera